Laborhood on Hire was a South Korean reality show program on tvN. It aired on tvN starting from August 24, 2019 to October 26, 2019 on Saturdays at 20:40 (KST).

Synopsis 
In this show, Yoo Jae-suk and guest celebrities head to different working places where there is a lack of employees. They work for them for a day, and at the end of the day, the guest celebrities will purchase something meaningful with the hard-earned money. Yoo will save his earnings, and on episode 9 he used it to buy assorted goods from the working places that appeared on the series as gifts to all of the guest celebrities.

Episodes

Ratings 
 Ratings listed below are the individual corner ratings of Laborhood on Hire. (Note: Individual corner ratings do not include commercial time, which regular ratings include.)

References

External links 
 Official website 

South Korean reality television series
South Korean television shows
2019 South Korean television series debuts
2019 South Korean television series endings
Korean-language television shows
TVN (South Korean TV channel) original programming